Abū Muṣʿab Aḥmad ibn Abī Bakr al-Qāsim ibn al-Ḥārith al-Zuhri, 767–856 CE / 150–242 AH, was a Muslim scholar and judge who was a student of Malik ibn Anas.

He was born and lived in Medina, where he wrote a work called  ('The Epitome on Fiqh'), as well as a recension of Malik ibn Anas' . He was dismissed from his position as qadi by Qutham ibn Ja'far in 210 AH (825/826 CE). In his judicial opinions (fatwas), he relied not only on hadith reports, but also on rational discretion.

References

Sources

Primary

Secondary

 

8th-century Muslim scholars of Islam
8th-century Arabs
9th-century Muslim scholars of Islam
9th-century Arabs
767 births
856 deaths